Clinton School District, Clinton Community School District, or Clinton Schools may refer to:

 Clinton School District (Arkansas) based in Clinton, Arkansas.
 Clinton Community School District (Iowa)
 Clinton School District (Michigan) (defunct) based in Royal Oak Township, Michigan.
 Clinton School District (Missouri) based in Clinton, Missouri.
 Clinton Community School District (Wisconsin)